The 1988 Yugoslavian motorcycle Grand Prix was the tenth round of the 1988 Grand Prix motorcycle racing season. It took place on the weekend of 15–17 July 1988 at the Rijeka circuit.

500 cc race report
Eddie Lawson dislocates his shoulder in practice, but starts the race against doctor's orders. He's 34 points ahead of Wayne Gardner.

Christian Sarron gets his 4th pole in a row, but Wayne Rainey gets the start from Gardner, Kevin Magee, et al.

Gardner through to 1st, then it's Rainey, Sarron, Magee and Niall Mackenzie.

Gardner and Sarron get a gap to Rainey and Magee, with Randy Mamola in a close 5th.

Gardner's 3rd win in a row, and he's now 20 points from Lawson.

500 cc classification

References

Yugoslav motorcycle Grand Prix
Yugoslavian
Motorcycle Grand Prix
Yugoslavian motorcycle Grand Prix